The 2022 Old Dominion Monarchs football team represented Old Dominion University during the 2022 NCAA Division I FBS football season. The Monarchs played their home games at S.B. Ballard Stadium in Norfolk, Virginia. It was their first football season in the Sun Belt Conference, competing in the East Division. Previously a member of the Sun Belt until 1991, the University did not field a football team at that time, nor did the conference sponsor the sport. The team was coached by third-year head coach Ricky Rahne.

Previous season

The Monarchs finished the 2021 season 6–7, 5–3 in C-USA play to finish in third place in the East Division. It was their best finish since 2016, when they finished second in the Division.

The Monarchs ended their season losing the Myrtle Beach Bowl to Tulsa.

Preseason

Media poll
The Sun Belt media days were held on July 25 and July 26. The Monarchs were predicted to finish in last place in the Sun Belt's East Division.

Sun Belt Preseason All-Conference teams

Offense

1st team
Zack Kuntz – Tight end, RS-JR
Ali Jennings III – Wide receiver, JR

2nd team
Nick Saldiveri – Offensive lineman, RS-JR

Schedule
All conference games were announced March 1, 2022.

Staff

Game summaries

Virginia Tech

at East Carolina

Statistics

at Virginia

Statistics

Arkansas State

Statistics

Liberty

Statistics

at Coastal Carolina

Statistics

Georgia Southern

Statistics

at Georgia State

Statistics

Marshall

Statistics

James Madison

Statistics

at Appalachian State

Statistics

at South Alabama

Statistics

References

Old Dominion
Old Dominion Monarchs football seasons
Old Dominion Monarchs football